Chestertown is a hamlet of the Town of Chester, in Warren County, New York, United States. It is located by the junction of Route 8 and U.S. Route 9, in the Adirondack Mountains. The population was 677 at the 2010 census, which lists the community as a census-designated place.

History
The community was founded in 1799 by New Englanders who built mills along its creeks. The first settlement was established around 1790 and was called Chester Four Corners.

The Chestertown Historic District was added to the National Register of Historic Places in 1977.

Geography
The ZIP code is 12817 and it is in the Eastern Time Zone. The nearest city is Glens Falls.

Demographics

Education
Children from Chestertown, along with children from the neighboring communities of Adirondack, Brant Lake and Pottersville, attend North Warren Central School.

Community and economy
The old school in the center of the village was transformed into the community center, with public library, town hall and Sheriff's office. There are also a theater and a medical center in the town. Main Street (U.S. Route 9) is lined with many stores, including Glens Falls National Bank. There are several hotels in the area.

The town has one public beach at Loon Lake.

Peckham Materials Corp., a manufacturer of asphalt and crushed stone, operates a large quarry at the southern end of the town.

Lincoln Logs Ltd., a manufacturer of log, timber, and cedar homes, which operates a large mill near the junction of Route 8 and U.S. Route 9.

Religion
There are three churches in the center of Chestertown: the St. John the Baptist Roman Catholic Church of the St. Isaac Jogues Parish Community, the Community United Methodist Church, and the Faith Bible Church. There are also many other churches in the area.

Lakes
There are three lakes in Chestertown, Friends Lake, Loon Lake, and Forest Lake. Friends and Loon Lakes are surrounded by vacation homes.  Forest Lake is privately owned by Forest Lake Camp - a traditional overnight summer camp since 1926.

Gallery

References

External links 
  Town of Chester, NY
  North Warren Chamber of Commerce
  Adirondack Northway Towns
 North Warren Central School

Hamlets in New York (state)
Census-designated places in New York (state)
Glens Falls metropolitan area
Census-designated places in Warren County, New York
Populated places established in 1799
1799 establishments in New York (state)
Hamlets in Warren County, New York